Ofanim is an Israeli nonprofit organization that brings education to some of the poorest and most remote villages in Israel through mobile classrooms.

Non-profit organizations based in Israel